Cafe D'Mongo's Speakeasy is a bar located at 1439 Griswold Street in downtown Detroit, Michigan.

About

Founded in 2007, D'Mongo's, the bar was featured on Esquire TV's "Best Bars in America" in 2014

D'Mongo's was also featured on "Bizarre Foods with Andrew Zimmern" on the Travel Channel. Also, Detroit-based film production company, Margrave Pictures, filmed "Boris the Porkchop Thief" inside D'Mongo's.

See also

Downtown Detroit
Speakeasy
The Purple Gang

References

External links
 D'Mongo's on Andrew Zimmern's Bizarre Foods
 D'Mongo's voted one of Best Bars in America by Esquire
 D'Mongo's on Detroit Eater
 Interview with D'Mongo's owner Larry Mongo

Restaurants in Detroit
Culture of Detroit
Speakeasies